The Philly sound in 1970s soul music, notable performers including Gamble and Huff, The O'Jays, The Stylistics, Teddy Pendergrass, Harold Melvin and The Delfonics, is well-known, as are  jazz legends like Billie Holiday, Nina Simone, and John Coltrane.  Philadelphia gave to the musical world diverse singers such as Marian Anderson, Mario Lanza, Solomon Burke, Chubby Checker, Dee Dee Sharp, and the trio performing as The Golden Boys, Frankie Avalon, Bobby Rydell and Fabian Forte, who grew up together in the same Philly neighborhood.  This city is also the birthplace of American Bandstand, and the home of Cameo-Parkway Records and the famed Philadelphia Orchestra.

Following the American Revolution, Philadelphia became especially renowned for musical development and was the home of the esteemed Alexander Reinagle, John Christopher Moller, Rayner Taylor and Susannah Haswell Rowson. Reinagle became the most influential figure in Philadelphia's musical life, organizing a number of concerts, organizations and musical events.  Francis Hopkinson, a signer of the Declaration of Independence, was a notable composer of the period.  One of his compositions, "My Days Have Been So Wondrous Free", is well-remembered as the first art song from the United States (though this is disputed); it is, however, lacking in originality and innovation to set it apart from European compositions.

During the 19th century, Lawrenceville, Pennsylvania became the birthplace of Stephen Foster, easily the most popular American songwriter of the century.

Indigenous music

Religious music in the colonial era

Rural Pennsylvania in the colonial era was home to religious minorities like the Quakers, as well as important Moravian and Lutheran communities.  While the Quakers had few musical traditions, Protestant churches frequently made extensive use of music in worship. J. F. Peter emerged from the Moravian tradition, while Conrad Beissel (founder of the Ephrata Cloister) innovated his own system of harmonic theory.  The Lutheran traditions of Johann Sebastian Bach, Dieterich Buxtehude, Johann Pachelbel and Walther were propagated in Pennsylvania, and the city of Bethlehem remains a center of Lutheran musical traditions today.

Mennonites

The Mennonites, followers of Menno Simons, settled in Germantown after emigrating from the German Palatinate and Switzerland between 1683 and 1748.  They were led by Willem Rittinghuysen (grandfather of astronomer and mathematician David Rittenhouse).  The Mennonites used a hymnbook from Schaffhausen, reprinted in Germantown in 1742 as Der Ausbund Das ist etliche schöne christliche Lieder.

Ephrata Cloister

The Ephrata Cloister (Community of the Solitary) was founded in what is now Lancaster County on the Cocalico River in 1720.  This was a group of Seventh Day Baptists led by Peter Miller and Conrad Beissel, who believed in using music as an integral part of worship.  Beissel codified the Ephrata Cloister's unique tradition in his Beissel's Dissertation on Harmony; here, he divided notes into two types.  These were masters, or notes belonging to the common chord, and servants, or all other notes.  Accented syllables in Beissel's works always fell on master notes, leaving servant notes for unaccented syllables.  The Ephrata Cloister's hymnbook was large, consisting of more than 1,000 hymns, many of which were accompanied by instruments including the violin.  Many of these hymns were published in the 1740s and 50s.

Moravian Church

Founded in 1457, the Moravian Church originally spread across Moravia, Poland and Bohemia before persecution forced the remaining faithful to Saxony, where they lived under the protection of Count Nikolaus Ludwig von Zinzendorf.  Zinzendorf wrote hymns, and led the Moravians to America, where they began missionary work in Georgia but with little success.  They moved on to Pennsylvania, and founded the town of Bethlehem on the banks of the Lehigh River.  A group then left for Salem, North Carolina (now a part of Winston-Salem).

Both in Salem and Bethlehem, Moravians continued to use music in their ceremonies.  Instruments included organs and trombones, and voices were usually in choirs.  Players generally played on rooftops for most any occasion, ensuring that they could be heard for great distances.  A legend has arisen claiming that a group of Native American warriors approached a Moravian settlement during the French and Indian War, but left after hearing a trombone choir because they believed it to be the voice of their Great Spirit.  Moravians were devoted to missionary work, especially among African slaves and Native Americans; in 1763, they published a collection of hymns in the Delaware language.

Moravians also had a tradition of secular art music that included the famed composer Johann Friedrich Peter, who was a German born in Holland who emigrated to Bethlehem in 1770.  He brought with him copies of compositions by Joseph Haydn, Johann Christoph Friedrich Bach, Johann Stamitz and C. F. Abel.  After living in Bethlehem for a time, Peter moved to Salem, where he founded the Collegium Musicum (in 1786) and collected hundreds of symphonies, anthems and oratorios.  It was during this period that Peter also composed a number of well-respected instrumental pieces for two violins, two violas and a cello; he also composed sacred anthems like "It Is a Precious Thing" and arias like "The Lord Is in His Holy Temple".

The Moravian Church continued to produce a number of renowned composers into the 19th century, including John Antes as well as Francis F. Hagen, Johann Christian Bechler, Edward W. Leinbach, Simon Peter, David Moritz Michael, Georg Gottfried Müller, Peter Wolle, Jeremiah Dencke and Johannes Herbst.  Herbst was also a noted collector, whose archives, left to the Salem church after his death, were made public in 1977; these included more than 11,000 pages of content.  Salem has gradually become the center for Moravian musical innovation, partially due to the presence of the Moravian Music Foundation.

Pietists

In 1694, Johannes Kelpius brought a group of German Pietists to the banks of the Wissahickon Creek.  These became known as the Hermits or Mystics of the Wissahickon; this 1871 map of Wissahickon Creek notes a Kelpius spring and Hermits Glen.  Kelpius was a musician, and he and his followers brought with them instruments that became an integral part of church life.  Kelpius was also a composer, and is sometimes called the first Pennsylvanian composer, based on his unproven authorship of several hymns in The Lamenting Voice of the Hidden Love.  It is likely that he wrote the text, though the tunes are mostly based on German songs; the English translations in the collection are attributed to Christopher Witt, an Englishman who immigrated and joined the mystics, also building them a pipe organ, said to be the first privately owned organ in North America.

Lutherans
Justus Falckner was the first Lutheran pastor to be ordained within the United States. He was ordained during 1703 as a minister of the Church of Sweden in the Gloria Dei Church. He is commemorated in the Calendar of Saints of the Lutheran Church on November 24. Falckner wrote hymns such as Rise, Ye Children of Salvation (German: Auf! ihr Christen, Christi Glieder) which he composed while a student at the University of Halle in 1697. Falckner's published works include Grondlycke Onderricht which first appeared in New York during 1708. Falckner evidently believed that music was a very important element of missionary work, writing to Germany to ask for an organ, which he said would attract more Native American converts.

Harmony Society

In 1803 and 1804, a group of Christian pietists led by George Rapp arrived from Württemberg, Germany, settled in Harmony, Pennsylvania, and formed the Harmony Society in 1805.  The group lived communally, were pacifistic, advocated celibacy, and music was a big part of their lives.  The Harmonites (or Harmonists) wrote their own music and even had an orchestra.  The Society lasted until 1906, but their final settlement, Old Economy Village (now Ambridge, Pennsylvania) contains archives with sheet music that is still performed at special community events.

Classical

Indianist movement composers Arthur Nevin and Charles Wakefield Cadman were from Pennsylvania.

Composer Samuel Barber was born in West Chester.

Composer David Ludwig was born in Bucks County.

Experimental music composer Maryanne Amacher was born in Kane.

Blues

Blues singer Gladys Bentley, active in the Harlem Renaissance, was born in Philadelphia.

Samuel Charters, born in Pittsburgh, was an American music historian, writer, record producer, musician, and poet. He was a widely published author on the subjects of blues and jazz music, including The Country Blues.

Jazz

Pennsylvania has a rich jazz music history, especially in Philadelphia, producing the likes of Billie Holiday, Nina Simone, Eddie Lang, and Stan Getz. Others include McCoy Tyner, Joe Venuti, Jimmy Amadie, Robert Chudnick, Jan Savitt, Philly Joe Jones, Reggie Workman, Lee Morgan, Henry Grimes, Ray Bryant, Tommy Bryant, Jimmy Heath, Albert Heath, Specs Wright, Benny Golson, Bobby Timmons, Hasaan Ibn Ali, Rashied Ali, Muhammad Ali, Sonny Fortune, Kenny Barron, Shirley Scott, Luckey Roberts, Jimmy McGriff, Bobby Durham, Stanley Clarke, Rex Stewart, Eric Reed, among many others.  Singer Ethel Waters was born in nearby Chester.  John Coltrane, Dizzy Gillespie, and Odean Pope, moved to Philadelphia from the Carolinas. Pearl Theatre was a notable jazz venue in Philadelphia.

Jazz musicians from Pittsburgh include pianist/composers Erroll Garner and Ahmad Jamal, bassist Paul Chambers, drummer Art Blakey, pianist Dodo Marmarosa, pianist Walt Harper, trumpeters Roy Eldridge and Tommy Turrentine, saxophonist Stanley Turrentine, hard bop pianist Horace Parlan, singer and bandleader Billy Eckstine, drummer and bandleader Kenny Clarke, double bassist and cellist Ray Brown, double bassist Eddie Safranski, drummer Roger Humphries, drummer Jeff "Tain" Watts, guitarist George Benson, and singer Dakota Staton. Hill District was an important jazz hub from the 1920-50s, including the famous jazz club Crawford Grill.

Composer, arranger, and trombonist Slide Hampton was born in Jeannette.  Pianist Sonny Clark was born in Herminie.  Singer Maxine Sullivan was born in Homestead. Influential pianist Earl Hines was from Duquesne.  Influential jazz organist Jimmy Smith was from Norristown.  Tenor saxophonist Joe Thomas was born in Uniontown.  Saxophonist Eric Kloss was born in Greenville. Trumpeter Joe Wilder was born in Colwyn.  Pianist Keith Jarrett was born in Allentown. Trombonist Lou Blackburn was born in Rankin. Organist/pianist Gene Ludwig was born in Cambria County. Multi-instrumentalist Daniel Carter was born in Wilkinsburg. Trumpeter Randy Brecker and saxophonist Michael Brecker were from Cheltenham.  Tommy and Jimmy Dorsey of The Dorsey Brothers were born in Schuylkill County.

Rock and popular music

The 1950s and 1960s

Jimmy Preston, from Chester, released "Rock the Joint" in 1949.

Lee Andrews & the Hearts were a doo-wop quintet formed in Philadelphia in 1953.

The Skyliners were a doo-wop group formed in Pittsburgh in 1958.

Bill Haley & His Comets from Chester had a #1 hit with "Rock Around the Clock" in 1955. This was a number-one single in the U.S. and was the first successful rock and roll song.

Formed in 1964, Harrisburg-based The Magnificent Men, became the only white act to ever headline New York City's legendary Apollo Theatre and the other major stops on the rhythm and blues chitlin circuit. In 1967, they got to back James Brown as he filled in for an absent headliner. Despite the last minute nature of the arrangement, the Godfather was floored by the band's dexterity. The next year they became the only outside group to play on a stage with the Motortown Revue at a show in Cleveland.

Artist Andy Warhol, born in Pittsburgh, produced many record covers, including iconic album art for The Velvet Underground and The Rolling Stones.

The 1970s
Tammi Terrell (d.1970) ("Ain't No Mountain High Enough") was from Philly and attended the University of Pennsylvania.

As mentioned, Philly Soul became a staple of 1970s R&B with such artists as Gamble & Huff, The O'Jays, Teddy Pendergrass, Harold Melvin and The Delfonics. The female-singing group, Labelle, lead by Patti LaBelle, had a #1 Hot 100 hit with "Lady Marmalade" in 1974. This song was covered in 2001 by Christina Aguilera and Pink (singer) (both Pennsylvania natives), with Mya and Lil' Kim. This cover also was #1 on the Billboard Hot 100.  In 1972, Billy Paul had a No. 1 hit with "Me and Mrs. Jones".

Violinist Papa John Creach, who played with Jefferson Airplane and Jefferson Starship, was born in Beaver Falls.

1980s

Pennsylvania had a number of key entries into the music scene of the 1980s and 1990s.

Hall & Oates are from Philadelphia and attended Temple University. They had 6 #1 Billboard Hot 100 hits, including "Maneater" in 1982. Todd Rundgren hails from the Philadelphia suburb of Upper Darby, which is also home of the world-famous Tower Theater.

Probably best known for his 1984 hit "I Can Dream About You", Harrisburg native Dan Hartman began his career in the 60's and became a well known performer, songwriter, and producer. Including writing the song "Living in America" for James Brown from the movie Rocky IV.

Rock music from western Pennsylvania tended to reflect a rust belt, white working class sensibility as far back as the mid-1960s.  The Vogues from the Pittsburgh area scored with the hit "Five O'Clock World" and several other hits.  The Jaggerz (named after a Pittsburgh English term for goofing off) had a hit in 1970 with "The Rapper"

Pittsburgh's Iron City Houserockers, kicked off the decade with immense critical acclaim for their first three albums (Love's So Tough, Have a Good Time But Get Out Alive and Blood On The Bricks).  Associated with the heartland rock subgenre and with artists like Bruce Springsteen, Bob Seger, John Mellencamp, and Tom Petty, the Houserockers were regarded by many as both grittier and more kinetic.  Although commercial success eluded the group, leader Joe Grushecky and the later incarnation of the band remain popular regional artists. In the Houserockers' wake came a number of other Pittsburgh area bands, including Norman Nardini and the Tigers, whose minor hit "If You Don't Love Me (Someone Will)" put the band briefly on the pop map.  More recent entries in the heartland rock scene (sometimes counted as Grushecky protégés) include Bill Toms and Hard Rain]and Tom Breiding who have strong local followings.

Donnie Iris, former member of The Jaggerz, had national success in 1980 with "Ah! Leah!", "Love Is Like a Rock", and a string of subsequent minor hits from 1980 to 1984.

The Stabilizers was a duo with sessions players for touring. They released a full album with many memorable songs. The song "One Simple Thing" went to number 21. The song "Tyranny" with hard hitting lyrics on how governments control their people had a lot of radio play but failed to chart. The song had two different versions that both got airplay. "Sounds Of The Underground" was never released as a single but was played by many local fans.

The Cynics were a garage rock band formed in Pittsburgh in 1983.  They started their own label, Get Hip Records.

The Hooters, from Philadelphia, broke into nationwide attention when they became the opening band at Live Aid where they performed "All You Zombies," soon to become their first hit single.  The album Nervous Night followed with several more major hits like "And We Danced" and "Day By Day" in 1985 and 1986.

Hair metal band Poison were originally from the Harrisburg area, but as was common with glam metal bands, relocated to Los Angeles before becoming successful. They had a #1 Hot 100 hit with "Every Rose Has Its Thorn" in 1988.

In 1979, The Sharks were formed in Harrisburg. In 1985, they won the an MTV Basement Tapes competition. The Sharks were regular performers at the iconic Metron, a large concert venue/nightclub in Harrisburg.

1990s

Nine Inch Nails frontman Trent Reznor hails from Mercer, Pennsylvania; while former drummer/programmer Chris Vrenna (also known for his work in other projects) is from Erie.

Live, who achieved commercial success with their second album Throwing Copper, hail from York.

Fuel, despite forming in Henderson, Tennessee, moved to Harrisburg in 1994 and eventually got signed while based there.

Acoustic-pop singer Jeffrey Gaines is also from Harrisburg.

The alternative band, The Ocean Blue formed in Hershey.

Death metal band Incantation are from Johnstown.

The Clarks, a rock/pop band who achieved major success in the 1990s with the songs "Born too late", "Penny on the floor", "Cigarette", "Better Off", are native to Pittsburgh.

Rusted Root, a jam band who has also had a prolific music career with the songs "Send Me on My Way", "Ecstasy", "Heaven", and "Free my soul", also call Pittsburgh home.

Train lead singer, Patrick Monahan, hails from Erie. He co-wrote the song Drops of Jupiter, which won two Grammy Awards in 2002.

G. Love and Special Sauce, who has had a string of successes with songs like "Stepping Stone" and "Recipe", is from Philadelphia.

The Bloodhound Gang are from the Philadelphia area, as are the hair metal bands Cinderella and Britny Fox.

Ween is from New Hope, Pennsylvania.

Christina Aguilera (from Pittsburgh) had 5 #1 Hot 100 hits, including "Genie in a Bottle" in 1999.

2000 to present
Here are some of the notable Pennsylvania musical acts of the new millennium:

Alecia Moore, aka P!nk, hails from Doylestown, Pennsylvania. She has had 4 #1 Hot 100 hits, including "Raise Your Glass" in 2010.

CKY is from West Chester.

Critically acclaimed hard rock sensation Breaking Benjamin are based out of Wilkes-Barre.

Metalcore band Motionless in White hails from Scranton.

Country and pop sensation Taylor Swift hails from Wyomissing, Pennsylvania.

The Grammy-winning hard rock band Halestorm formed in Red Lion.

The War on Drugs is an indie-rock band from Philadelphia.

Singer-songwriter Christina Perri is also from Philadelphia. Her older brother, Nick Perri, is a lead guitarist formerly of Shinedown and Philly-based hard rock act Silvertide, and currently plays in SINAI.

Although Justin Guarini was born in Georgia, he spent most of his life in Doylestown, Pennsylvania. Justin was the runner up in the first season of American Idol, losing to Kelly Clarkson.

The Amish Outlaws are a cover band based in Lancaster, Pennsylvania. Four of the members are from Pennsylvania Dutch Country, with three of them being ex-members of the Old Order Amish.

Punk rock

Philadelphia had a flourishing new wave scene that included local acts The Vels, Executive Slacks, and Regressive Aid.  Hardcore punk had a significant scene as well, led by Sadistic Exploits along with MCRAD, Electric Love Muffin, Autistic Behavior, dresden, and Informed Sources.  Later bands like Zen Guerilla and Dead Milkmen gained some national success. Notable crust punk group Aus-Rotten also hail from the state.  Flag of Democracy have released seven albums since 1982 and toured the world. Renowned pop-punk act The Wonder Years hail from Lansdale.

Harrisburg's The Outrage and Pittsburgh's Real Enemy, Necracedia, and Anti-Flag had a local hardcore following as well and often played shows in central PA with Altoona hardcore punk band The Insignificant.  Metalcore bands such as August Burns Red and Texas in July are from the Lancaster area.

Friction is a Ska/Punk from Lewistown, Pennsylvania, which eventually morphed into New York City-based Caesar Pink and The Imperial Orgy.  Although Friction enjoyed a large and dedicated following in Pennsylvania with several radio friendly songs, they disbanded while on the verge of signing with a major label, but not before their music was played to a world-wide audience on Radio Moscow in 1987.  Friction re-unites periodically with mostly original members.

Another band to hail from Pittsburgh's punk/rock/pop scene was Damaged Pies. The Pies started at such clubs as The Electric Banana, and The Decade and have gone on to play some of the world's most legendary rock venues, including the Cavern in Liverpool, CBGBs in New York City, The Whisky A Go Go in Los Angeles, the Rock and Roll Hall of Fame in Cleveland, Ohio and even the Wheeling Jamboree in Wheeling, West Virginia. The band has recorded at the legendary Sun Studio in Memphis and Trident Studio in London. In addition to these the band has been on the road at venues all over North America and the United Kingdom for the past twenty years. Punk rock band The Menzingers hail from Scranton, Pennsylvania. Folk punk / gypsy punk singer/songwriter Erik Petersen of Mischief Brew also hails from the state, and penned the song O, Pennsyltucky in homage to the region.

Hip hop, R&B, and neo soul

Hip hop music, R&B music, and neo soul music are popular elements of entertainment in Pennsylvania, and have earned many different performers within said genres.

Will Smith and his hip-hop partnership with Jazzy Jeff, DJ Jazzy Jeff & the Fresh Prince, came from Philadelphia. Smith had 3 #1 Hot 100 hits, including "Gettin' Jiggy Wit It" and "Wild Wild West".  Boyz II Men, the soulful, gospel-tinged, R&B act from the 1990s are also from Philadelphia.  They had 4 #1 Hot 100 hits including "I'll Make Love to You".  Other artists from Philadelphia include Jill Scott, The Roots, Eve, Cassidy, Chiddy Bang, Da Youngsta's, Tuff Crew, Beanie Sigel, Freeway, Jedi Mind Tricks, Lil Uzi Vert, Meek Mill (had a #1 album on Billboard 200 in 2018), Ms. Jade, Reef the Lost Cauze, Schoolly D, The High & Mighty, and Young Gunz.

Rappers Mac Miller and Wiz Khalifa are from Pittsburgh. Mac Miller had a #1 album on the Billboard 200 with Blue Slide Park in 2011. He died in 2018 at age 26, and is buried in Pittsburgh. Khalifa has 2 #1 Hot 100 hits: "Black and Yellow" and "See You Again".

Rapper Asher Roth is from Morrisville.

See also

Music of Philadelphia 
List of people from Pennsylvania
Musikfest

References

 (2001). American Hardcore: A Tribal History. Los Angeles, CA: Feral House. .

External links
 -Pittsburgh Music History

 
Pennsylvania
Pennsylvania culture